Hammerstein is a German surname. Notable people with the surname include:

Arthur Hammerstein (1872–1955), American opera producer
Carl-Detlev Freiherr von Hammerstein (born 1938), German farmer and politician (CDU)
David Hammerstein Mintz (born 1955), Spanish politician
Dorothy Hammerstein (1899-1987), Australian-American interior designer and decorator 
Elaine Hammerstein (1897–1948), American actress
James Hammerstein (1931-199), American theatre director and producer
Marie Luise von Hammerstein (1908-1999), German lawyer
Mike Hammerstein (born 1963), American football player
Notker Hammerstein (born 1930), German historian
Oscar Hammerstein I (1847–1919), German-American theatre impresario
Oscar Hammerstein II (1895–1960), American songwriter and musical director
Reinhold Hammerstein (1915-2010), German musicologist
Stella Hammerstein (1882-1975), American actress
Wilhelm Joachim von Hammerstein (1838-1904), German politician
Willie Hammerstein (1874–1914), American theatre manager

See also
Hans von Hammerstein-Loxten (1843-1905), Prussian politician, interior minister of Prussia
Kurt von Hammerstein-Equord (1878–1943), German general
Ernst von Hammerstein-Loxten (1827-1914), Prussian politician, agriculture minister of Prussia

German-language surnames

de:Hammerstein (Familienname)